Parera Pond is a pond lying  south of Andrews Ridge in Taylor Valley, Victoria Land. It was named by the New Zealand Geographic Board in 1998. Parera is the Maori word for wild duck.

Further reading
 W. Andrew Jackson, Alfonso F. Davila, Nubia Estrad, W. Berry Lyons, John D. Coates, John C. Priscu, Perchlorate and chlorate biogeochemistry in ice-covered lakes of the McMurdo Dry Valleys, Antarctica, P 22

 RUTH C. HEINDEL, ANGELA M. SPICKARD, and ROSS A. VIRGINIA, Landscape-scale soil phosphorus variability in the McMurdo Dry Valleys, Antarctic Science (2017), P 4

 Aneliya Sakaeva, Ecology and Biogeography of Freshwater Diatoms in Ponds of McMurdo Dry Valleys and Parts of the Ross Island , (2014). Environmental Studies Graduate Theses & Dissertations. 20.

References

Lakes of Victoria Land
McMurdo Dry Valleys